Black Bear is a populated place, originally a gold mining town in Klamath County, now in unincorporated Siskiyou County, California.

It is located on Black Bear Creek, a tributary of the South Fork Salmon River.

History

Black Bear, now in Siskiyou County was a gold mining camp, in the now defunct Klamath County, that had a post office from 1869.  From 1874 it was within that part of Klamath County annexed to Siskiyou County.  Its post office was closed and moved to Sawyers Bar in 1941.

References

Settlements formerly in Klamath County, California
Unincorporated communities in Siskiyou County, California
Populated places established in 1869
1869 establishments in California
Unincorporated communities in California